Bortsov (masculine) or Bortsova (feminine) is a Russian surname. Notable people with the surname include:

Nikolay Bortsov (born 1945), Russian politician
Viktor Bortsov (1934–2008), Russian Soviet actor
Vladimir Bortsov (born 1974), Kazakhstani cross-country skier

See also
Bortz (surname)

Russian-language surnames